A.F.C. Mansfield is a football club based in Forest Town, a suburb of Mansfield, Nottinghamshire, England.

History
A.F.C. Mansfield was formed in June 2012 by three former directors of Mansfield Town following a series of management disputes. The new club were immediately given a place in the Central Midlands League, and were placed in the North Division. After finishing as runners-up in their first season, the club won the North Division in 2013–14, earning promotion to Division One of the Northern Counties East League. They also completed the double, winning the Central Midlands League Cup, beating Thorne Colliery 2–1 in the final.

AFC Mansfield finished seventh in Division One in 2014–15. The following season saw them finish as runners-up, earning promotion to the Premier Division. They also competed in the FA Cup for the first time, losing 2–1 at South Normanton Athletic in the extra-preliminary round. The club finished third in the Premier Division in 2017–18, missing out on promotion on goal difference. However, after Andover Town refused promotion, AFC Mansfield were promoted instead, moving up to Division One East of the Northern Premier League. Despite finishing outside the relegation zone, the club were demoted to the Northern Counties East League's Premier Division at the end of the 2018–19 season after their ground failed to meet the necessary criteria.

Season-by-season record

Honours
Central Midlands League
North Division champions 2013–14
League Challenge Cup winners 2013–14
Nottinghamshire Intermediate Cup
Winners 2012–13
Toolstation Charity Cup
Winners 2017–18

Records
Best FA Cup performance: Third qualifying round, 2016–17, 2017–18
Best FA Trophy performance: Second qualifying round, 2018–19
Best FA Vase performance: Fifth round, 2014–15
Record attendance : 613 vs Boston United, FA Cup third qualifying round, 30 September 2017
Record win: 16–0 Yorkshire main, Central Midlands League North Division, 15 September 2012

See also
A.F.C. Mansfield players
A.F.C. Mansfield managers

References

External links
Official website

 
Football clubs in Nottinghamshire
Football clubs in England
Association football clubs established in 2012
2012 establishments in England
Sport in Mansfield
Central Midlands Football League
Northern Counties East Football League
Northern Premier League clubs